Bryan Eley (born 28 January 1939) is a British racewalker. He competed in the men's 50 kilometres walk at the 1968 Summer Olympics.

References

1939 births
Living people
Athletes (track and field) at the 1968 Summer Olympics
British male racewalkers
Olympic athletes of Great Britain
Place of birth missing (living people)